Southdean is a hamlet in the Scottish Borders area of Scotland, on the A6088, by the Jed Water and in the Wauchope Forest area. Other settlements nearby include Abbotrule, Bedrule, Bonchester Bridge, Denholm, Hallrule, Hobkirk and the Swinnie Forest.

Ruins which can be seen nearby include the remains of Southdean Old Parish Church, the remains of Dykeraw Tower, and the remains of Slack's Tower.

James Telfer (1802 - 1862) was born in Southdean, and wrote ballads about farming life, typically with a zoological slant.

See also
List of places in the Scottish Borders
List of places in Scotland

External links

RCAHMS record for Southdean Parish (a.k.a. Charteris P.)
Forestry Commission / Southdean Community Council consultation
Gazetteer for Scotland: Parish of Southdean
GENUKI entry for Southdean
Streetmap of Southdean and Wauchope Forest
GEOGRAPH image: Wauchope Forest near Southdean
Parish of Hobkirk and Southdean with Ruberslaw

Villages in the Scottish Borders
Parishes in Roxburghshire